Mandothi is a village in the Jhajjar District of Haryana, India.

References 

Villages in Jhajjar district